Source Radio is a radio station operating from Coventry, England. It is a division of the Coventry University Students' Union, and broadcast to the Campus and beyond, online.  It occasionally operated for short periods on FM and AM, complemented by a near CD-quality version of the output via the Internet.

Known as "Source FM" from 2001 to 2005, and "Phoenix Radio" before that, the station changed its name as part of a rebrand to eliminate confusion over the fact that broadcasts on FM were very occasional, and that the station was available on other platforms.

History 

The rebrand came about as the station rarely broadcast on FM, and with the (later-fulfilled) possibility of an AM licence on the way it was felt it was time to strengthen the brand.

Around the same time youth station Kix 96.2 closed down in the city, and flipped to an adult contemporary station, Touch Radio, which made it part of a network of stations in the Midlands. Source Radio, took this opportunity to fill the gap left, and although Radio 1 became the number one station in the city, Source Radio's placing and status offered a distinctive opportunity.

The station launched to the city on 1431AM on Monday, 5 March 2007 under the management of Kat Page, with a special programme presented live from the Students' Union nightclub, FiftyFour.

The AM launch coincided with the launch of 3G Smart Phones which could stream radio via apps such as TuneIn.  This provided a means of listening on the move in a far better quality than AM.  The young target audience are generally also quite "AM-resistant" and as a result, the 1431AM service never reached a particularly sizeable audience.  The decision was taken to discontinue the AM service in 2009.

Flirt! and Source Radio 

During the 2000s, Students Unions across the country participated in a national event called "Flirt!", a franchise for an evening entertainment event. CUSU became the first union in the country to have its radio station simulcast the event live on its radio station throughout the 2004–05 academic year.

Phoenix Radio CU 

In 2019, Coventry University launched a new station under the name Phoenix Radio CUSU, with the name being changed to Phoenix Radio CU in September 2022, Coventry's Biggest Student Station, playing all the biggest hits and throwbacks around the world. This station is run by students from Coventry University who have a variety of shows that run 24/7 which you can listen to via the Phoenix Radio CU App on all devices. Phoenix Radio CUSU has been involved in a short space of time such as The 24-Hour 1 Year Anniversary and Phoenix Radio's Children in Need which won a Bronze Amplify Award for Best Fundraising Initiative. Different shows include Indie, Techno, Pop, Hip-Hop, R&B, Neo-Soul, and podcasts-style radio, all hosted by the students at the University.

Over the last few years, the presenters and team have taken part in many different events, such as the 1st Anniversary where special guest Wynter Black performed and co-hosted, the 24-Hour Broadcast with Matt Jenkins, Phoenix Radio's Children in Need, Phoenix Radio's Commonwealth Games and Phoenix Radio's Special Broadcast for the announcement of Boris Johnson leaving 10 Downing Street which was aired the day of the initial announcement, lead by Jude Avery and Maddy Griffiths, Kristof Kiss, Phoebe Lewin, and Jay Willz. Phoenix Radio also hosted a special broadcast regarding The FIFA 2022 World Cup Win, hosted by Jude Avery,  Ellianna Skye, Ryan Kinnerlsey, Jay Willz and Phoenix Radio CU Veteran Jake Barker.

Current Presenters

Gisa Arumagarasa, Jude Avery, Eddie Chadwick, Sam Clawley, Jacob Day, Maddy Griffiths, Ryan Kinnersley, Kristof Kiss, Phoebe Lewin, Katie Light, Rishi Pu, Haydar Rahman, Princess Sarker, Yinka Shokunbi, Jasmine Siddon, Ellianna Skye, Brandon Weir, Jay Willz, Jack Woolf

Current Behind Production Team

Charlie Fitzpatrick - Voice and Imaging

Roxanne Farias - Producer

Millie Hudson - Voice and Adverts

Previous Presenters

·Jake Barker, Kazzie Bazzie, Will Brennan, Louis Greaves, Matt Jenkins, Zahra Khan, Maxim Maddox, Aubrey Morandarte, Em Smith, Taiwo Oluwabusolami, Johnny Winterton

Mixcloud Charts

In 2022, Phoenix Radio CU joined Mixcloud so listeners can re-listen to shows that were live. The shows are released on Mixcloud after the shows are aired. Phoenix Radio CU featured on 14 Gloval Mixcloud Charts. The Global Acoustic, Global Interview, Global Indie Folk, Global Radio, Global 1990s, Global 2000s, Global 2010s, Global Indietronica, Global Alternative Rock, Global Indie/Dance, Global New Wave, Global Free Improvisation, Global Dance Rock and were first on the Global Dance-Punk Charts.

Alumni

Phoenix Radio CU was the home for many radio presenters who have since thrived over their years on the station, including, Author Jake Barker, ITN's Kazzie Bazzie and Global's Matt Jenkins.

Special Guests

Over the last few years, Phoenix Radio CU has had the opportunity to collaborate with well-known presenters across the United Kingdom. Many include Radio 1 Breakfast's Greg James. Capital's Chris Stark Jordan North Ben Mundy, Pria Rai and Steve Holden. KISSFM's Sam Darlaston, Reprezent Radio's Mollie Finn and Magic FM's Will Short. CBBC's Joe Maw, The HIMALAYAS Band, Matt Goss and Grant Nicholas from hit band Feeder.

Awards

In April 2022, Phoenix Radio CU won Bronze for "The Amplify Awards Best Fundraising Initiative" for the fundraiser they created in November 2021, a week of fundraising in aid of BBC's Children in Need. From Monday 15th November to Friday 19th November 2021, presenters on Phoenix Radio CU came together to do special shows and challenges for Children in Need. On Friday 19th November 2021, they hosted a Live YouTube Television Special, "Phoenix Radio's Children in Need" hosted by Phoenix Radio Presenters, Jude Avery, Jacob Day, Kristof Kiss, Louis Greaves, and Maddy Griffiths, featuring guests such as Alex Hilton, Malu Molina, and Katus Myles. By the end of the week on the live show, the presenters revealed they earned £175 for Children in Need. In late 2022, Phoenix Radio CU was nominated for two awards at "The Student Radio Awards" Best Journalistic Programming and Best Station Sound. In early 2023, Phoenix Radio CU was nominated for five Amplify Awards, the most nominations ever for one event.

Best Fundraising Initiative Amplify Awards 2022 - Won (Bronze)

Best Station Sound SRAs 2022 - Nominated

Best Journalistic Programming SRAs 2022 - Nominated

Student Radio Moment of the Year Amplify Awards 2023 - Nominated

Outstanding Contribution Amplify Awards 2023 - Nominated

Best Contribution to The Region Amplify Awards 2023 - Nominated

Most Improved Station Amplify Awards 2023 - Nominated

Best Station Culture Amplify Awards 2023 - Nominated

References

External links 

Coventry University's Student Union Source Radio mini-site
https://www.instagram.com/cusuphoenixradio/
https://www.radioworld.com/global/radio-comes-to-coventry
https://radiotoday.co.uk/2022/11/student-radio-awards-2022-full-winners-list/

Coventry University
Radio stations in the West Midlands (region)
Student radio in the United Kingdom